Dianulites is an extinct genus of bryozoans from the early Ordovician period, belonging to the family Dianulitidae. Its colonies can be turbinate, horn-shaped, conical, or massive and hemispherical. Individual zooecia take the form of long, thin-walled polygonal tubes. It lacks styles (acanthopores), which helps differentiate it from similar genus Nicholsonella.

References

Prehistoric bryozoan genera